Dr. James Robertson (born 9 June 1966) is a Jamaican politician from the Labour Party. He served as the Minister of Mining and Energy in Jamaica between March 2009 and May 2011. He has been the MP for Saint Thomas Western since 2002.

References

1966 births
Living people
Members of the House of Representatives of Jamaica
Government ministers of Jamaica
21st-century Jamaican politicians
People from Saint Thomas Parish, Jamaica
Members of the 14th Parliament of Jamaica